Zabidius novemaculeatus, the ninespine batfish or short-finned batfish, is a species of batfish native to coral reefs around Indonesia, Papua New Guinea and Australia at depths of from . This species is the only known member of its genus.

References

External links
 Photograph
 Zabidius novemaculeatus IUCN Red List of Threatened Species 2019

Ephippidae
Fish described in 1916